This is a list of mathematical conjectures.

Open problems
The following conjectures remain open.  The (incomplete) column "cites" lists the number of results for a Google Scholar search for the term, in double quotes .

Conjectures now proved (theorems)

The conjecture terminology may persist: theorems often enough may still be referred to as conjectures, using the anachronistic names.

 Deligne's conjecture on 1-motives
 Goldbach's weak conjecture (proved in 2013)
 Sensitivity conjecture (proved in 2019)

Disproved (no longer conjectures)
 Atiyah conjecture (not a conjecture to start with)
 Borsuk's conjecture
 Chinese hypothesis (not a conjecture to start with)
 Doomsday conjecture
 Euler's sum of powers conjecture
 Ganea conjecture
 Generalized Smith conjecture
 Hauptvermutung
 Hedetniemi's conjecture, counterexample announced 2019
 Hirsch conjecture (disproved  in 2010)
 Intersection graph conjecture
 Kelvin's conjecture
 Kouchnirenko's conjecture
 Mertens conjecture
 Pólya conjecture, 1919 (1958)
 Ragsdale conjecture
 Schoenflies conjecture (disproved 1910) 
 Tait's conjecture
 Von Neumann conjecture
 Weyl–Berry conjecture
 Williamson conjecture

See also
 Erdős conjectures
 Fuglede's conjecture
 Millennium Prize Problems
 Painlevé conjecture
 List of unsolved problems in mathematics
 List of disproved mathematical ideas
 List of unsolved problems
 List of lemmas
 List of theorems
 List of statements undecidable in ZFC

References

External links
Open Problem Garden

Conjectures